Established in South Korea in 1998, TOPFIELD Co., Ltd. is a consumer electronics manufacturer making broadcasting receivers, other video and audio related apparatus.  Their main business is making products such as set top boxes (STBs) and personal video recorders (PVRs) to be used with satellite television or digital television.  Topfield have never manufactured televisions.

The company has head offices in Bundang, South Korea, and branch offices in Germany and Thailand.

Personal Video Recorder 
Topfield produces PVRs for standard- and high-definition television program recording. The PVRs store the digital files in a container-format with the *.REC file extension on their hard-disk drives; Topfield and freeware software is available to transfer these files between a Topfield PVR with USB support and a computer. Some freeware and commercial software recognises this format, and can convert and play files.

Various unofficial alternative versions of operating software with additional features and bug fixes have been made available, and the operation of Topfield PVRs can be substantially modified by installing third-party Topfield Application Programs (TAPs).

Models 
A complete list of models is available on the Topfield website
 DBC-5100
 TF-100C Black Edition
 TF-100T Black Edition
 TF400PVRc
 TF400PVRt
 TF500PVRc
 TF500PVRt
 TF550PVR
 TF600PVRc
 TF600PVRt
 TF650PVR
 TF5000 PVRt
 TF5800PVR TF58x0 models are UK Freeview PVRs 
 TF5800PVRt
 TF5810PVRt
 TF7100HD PVRt Plus
 TRF-2100
 TRF-2460
 TRF-2400
 TRF-7160

References

External links

 Topfield's Official Korean site
 TAPWorld - A directory of Topfield Application Programs (TAPs)
 Topfield's Russian site
 Topfield Australian Forum
 Oztoppy Wiki - An independent wiki with information about different Topfield models sold in Australia
 Toppy - UK based user forum
 Topfield freeview PVR - An independent site with much UK Topfield PVR5800 and PVR5800t information.
 More information about Topfield 5000 and 5100 PVR models sold in Finland (in Finnish)
 Antares, open source alternative to the Topfield software "Altair" for both 32- and 64-bit Windows v1.1 .

Electronics companies of South Korea
Digital television
Satellite television
Companies established in 1998
South Korean brands